Mosekongen is a 1950 Danish family film directed by Jon Iversen and Alice O'Fredericks.

Cast
Johannes Meyer as Claus Munk
Poul Reichhardt as Jørgen Munk
Tove Maës as Hanne
Peter Malberg as Sofus 'Fusser' Hansen
Grete Frische as Norma
William Rosenberg as Erik Jelling
Signi Grenness as Grete Sander
Asbjørn Andersen as Julius Sander
Grethe Holmer as Ellen Madsen
Randi Michelsen as Abelone Madsen
Axel Frische as Jesper Madsen
Agnes Rehni as Fru Karen Winge
Poul Müller as Ejendomsmægler Søren Just
Ib Schønberg as Martin Hald
Helga Frier as Johanne Hald
Sigurd Langberg as Tjener Rasmussen
Henry Nielsen as Ole Post
Jørn Jeppesen as Redaktør Juul
Ruth Brejnholm as Stuepigen Clara
Christian Møller as Redaktør Andreasen
Edith Hermansen
Anna Henriques-Nielsen as Marianne Wævers
Carl Heger as Ole
Aage Foss as Gamle Søren

External links

1950 films
1950s Danish-language films
Danish black-and-white films
Films directed by Alice O'Fredericks
Films scored by Sven Gyldmark